Ingersoll Lockwood (August 2, 1841 – September 30, 1918) was an American lawyer and writer. He wrote children's novels, including the Baron Trump novels (1889/93), as well as the dystopian novel, 1900: or; The Last President, a play, and several non-fiction works. He wrote some of his non-fiction under the pseudonym Irwin Longman.

Life and legal career
Lockwood was born in Ossining, New York, the son of Munson Ingersoll and Sarah Lewis (née Smith) Lockwood. Munson Lockwood, like his two older brothers, Ralph and Albert, was a lawyer and intimate friend of Henry Clay. However, Munson primarily achieved prominence during his military service and civic activism. He was a general in the New York State Militia and commandant of its 7th Brigade. A great admirer of the Hungarian statesman and freedom fighter Lajos Kossuth, Munson actively raised funds for him in New York. He was also one of the founders of Ossining's first bank and Dale Cemetery and served as the Warden of Sing Sing prison from 1850 to 1855. Lockwood had two brothers, Henry Clay Lockwood and Howard Lockwood.

Like his father and uncles, Ingersoll Lockwood trained as a lawyer, although his first position was as a diplomat. In 1862 he was appointed Consul to the Kingdom of Hanover by Abraham Lincoln. At the time he was the youngest member of the U.S. consular force and served in that post for four years. On his return he established a legal practice in New York City with his older brother Henry.

By the 1880s Lockwood had established a parallel career as a lecturer and writer. In 1884, he married Winifred Wallace Tinker, a graduate of Vassar College and aspiring author. They were divorced in 1892. That same year she married Edward R. Johnes, a lawyer by profession and a literateur by avocation. He was described in Current Literature as Winifred's "kind and most sympathetic literary advisor."

Lockwood spent his retirement years as a recluse in Saratoga Springs, New York where he published his last book, a collection of poetry entitled In Varying Mood, or, Jetsam, Flotsam and Ligan in 1912. It opens with juxtaposed photographs of Lockwood at age 35 and at age 70. In the preface, he wrote:

The end has almost come. I'm only waiting for the signal to push off and begin my voyage to the Isles of the Blest in the far Western Seas. I was troubled in my mind at first, for my little bark, staunch though it may be, sat too deep in the water. It was overladen with conceits that wouldn't be current and merchandise that wouldn't be saleable in the Isles of the Blest. Overboard with it! Now that I have lightened ship I feel better.

Lockwood died in Saratoga Springs five years later, in 1918, at the age of 77. He had no children or surviving relatives.

Notes

References

External links
 
 
 Library of Congress database containing his books

1841 births
1918 deaths
People from Ossining, New York
People from Saratoga Springs, New York
19th-century American novelists
19th-century American male writers
New York (state) lawyers
Writers from New York (state)
19th-century American lawyers